Fraser Range Station is a pastoral lease and sheep station located about  east of Norseman on the Eyre Highway in the Goldfields-Esperance region  of Western Australia.

Located on the western fringe of the Nullarbor Plain the station largely bears little resemblance to the Nullabor proper. Dense Eucalypt hardwood forest dominates much of the area.

The station is to the west of the Nanambinia, Balladonia, and Noondonia stations which lie to the north and south of Eyre Highway.

The Dempster brothers were the first settlers on the station and arrived in 1872.

See also
List of ranches and stations

References

Homesteads in Western Australia
Pastoral leases in Western Australia
Goldfields-Esperance
Stations (Australian agriculture)
Nullarbor Plain
1870 establishments in Australia